Hysteronotus megalostomus is a species of characin endemic to Brazil where it is found in the upper São Francisco River basin. This species is the only member of its genus.

References

Characidae
Monotypic fish genera
Fish of the São Francisco River basin
Endemic fauna of Brazil
Fish described in 1911